This article lists events that occurred during 1942 in Estonia.

Incumbents

Events
 28 August – Estonian Legion is started to form.
 Bombing by Soviets.

Births
 9 February – Ada Lundver, actress (d. 2011)
 15 November – Hans Kaldoja, actor (d. 2017)

Deaths

References

 
1940s in Estonia
Estonia
Estonia
Years of the 20th century in Estonia